Doctor Antonio (Italian:Il dottor Antonio) is a 1954 Italian television series, based on the 1855 novel of the same title by Giovanni Ruffini. It aired in four parts on RAI, the state broadcaster that had launched the same year. It was the first literary adaptation to be broadcast on Italian television.

Synopsis
In the mid-nineteenth century a patriot fighting for Italian unification meets and falls in love with an English aristocrat while in exile. Eventually he decides to leave her and return to fight and die for his country.

Cast
Luciano Alberici
Edmonda Aldini
Corrado Anicelli
Miranda Campa
Alberto Carloni
Mario Colli
Olinto Cristina
Emma Danieli
Enzo Donzelli
Cristina Fanton
Betty Foà
Giacomo Furia
Antonio Cifariello
Mario Maldesi
Grazia Marescalchi
Ludovica Modugno
Alighiero Noschese
Corrado Pani
Stefano Sibaldi
Jolanda Verdirosi

References

Bibliography
 Buonanno, Milly. Italian TV Drama and Beyond: Stories from the Soil, Stories from the Sea. Intellect Books, 2012.

1950s Italian television series
Italian drama television series
1954 Italian television series debuts